The 1989 Arcachon Cup was a women's tennis tournament played on outdoor clay courts in Arcachon, France that was part of the Category 2 tier of the 1989 WTA Tour. The tournament was held from 10 July until 16 July 1989. Judith Wiesner won the singles title.

Finals

Singles

 Judith Wiesner defeated  Barbara Paulus 6–3, 6–7(3–7), 6–1
 It was Wiesner's 2nd title of the year and the 5th of her career.

Doubles

 Sandra Cecchini /  Patricia Tarabini defeated  Mercedes Paz /  Brenda Schultz 6–3, 7–6(7–5)
 It was Cecchini's 1st title of the year and the 11th of her career. It was Tarabini's 1st title of the year and the 1st of her career.

External links
 ITF tournament edition details
 Tournament draws

Arcachon Cup
Arcachon Cup
1989 in French tennis